Río Quito is a municipality and town in the Chocó Department, Colombia.

Climate
Rio Quito has a very wet tropical rainforest climate (Af). The following climate data is for Paimadó, the capital of the municipality.

References 

Municipalities of Chocó Department